The 1954 FIBA World Championship (also called the 2nd World Basketball Championship – 1954) was an international basketball tournament held by the International Basketball Federation in Ginásio do Maracanãzinho, Rio de Janeiro, Brazil from 23 October to 5 November 1954. Twelve nations participated in the tournament.

Competing nations

Preliminary round

Group A

Group B

Group C

Group D

Classification round
All teams play one game against each other for a total of three games.

Final round
All teams play one game against each other for a total of seven games. The teams with the best records are awarded medals.

Awards

Top scorers

All-tournament team

Final rankings

 source:FIBA

References

External links
 
 
 FIBA 1954 World Championships
 FIBA 1954 World Cup

 
FIBA Basketball World Cup
FIBA
FIBA